Malcolm Jamaal Davis (born April 12, 1992), better known by his stage name MadeinTYO (pronounced Made in Tokyo), is an American rapper and singer born in Honolulu, Hawaii. He rose to prominence in 2016 after the release of his single "Uber Everywhere"; its official remix (featuring Travis Scott) was later included on his mixtape You Are Forgiven. His debut studio album, Sincerely, Tokyo, was released in October 2018.

Early life 
Malcolm Jamaal Davis was born on April 12, 1992, in Honolulu, Hawaii. He grew up as a military brat, moving around and living in areas such as Hawaii, California, Texas, New York, and Virginia, before spending the rest of his teenage years in Tokyo, Japan. Davis was inspired to begin writing music after watching his cousin produce music in his room while living in Washington, D.C.

After he came back from a trip from Tokyo to the United States, Davis moved to Atlanta with his older brother 24hrs for his later young adulthood.

Career 
MadeinTYO released his debut single titled "Uber Everywhere" on February 26, 2016, on Commission Music and Private Club Records. The song peaked at number 51 on the Billboard Hot 100 and number 10 on urban radio. The official remix of the song featured American rapper Travis Scott. The single was eventually certified double platinum by the Recording Industry Association of America (RIAA). His subsequent singles, "I Want" (featuring 2 Chainz) and "Skateboard P", were certified gold and platinum by the RIAA. The remix version of the latter features rapper Big Sean was released on November 4, 2016.

In April 2016, MadeinTYO premiered his debut mixtape, You Are Forgiven. It was commercially released on iTunes in August 2016. You Are Forgiven peaked at number 122 on the Billboard 200 chart.: According to Business Insider, MadeinTYO was one of the top five most streamed new artists of 2016 on Spotify. MadeinTYO has released two EPs, 24Hrs in Tokyo (a collaboration with his brother, 24hrs) and True's World, in 2016 and 2017, respectively.

In 2017, MadeinTYO was selected for that year's XXL freshman class list along with A Boogie wit da Hoodie, PnB Rock, Playboi Carti, Ugly God, Kyle, Aminé, Kamaiyah, Kap G, and XXXTentacion.

On June 1, 2018, MadeinTYO released a single "Ned Flanders" featuring rapper ASAP Ferg. It later served as the lead single from his debut studio album, Sincerely, Tokyo, released on October 26, 2018.

On October 30, 2020, he released his second studio album, Never Forgotten.

Artistry 
In an XXL interview, Davis cited Pharrell, 24hrs, Gucci Mane, and M.I.A. as influences.

Personal life 
Davis began dating Philadelphia based painter and digital artist Distortedd (real name Anhia Santana), in late 2015. The couple announced that they were expecting a baby boy in June 2016 via social media. Their son was born on January 29, 2017. The couple announced that they were engaged in February 2017. The engagement was later called off. Davis lives in Los Angeles with his son.

Discography 

 Sincerely, Tokyo (2018)
 Never Forgotten (2020)
 NEO TYO (2023)

References 

Living people
African-American male rappers
1992 births
21st-century American rappers
Mumble rappers
21st-century American male musicians
Rappers from Hawaii
21st-century African-American musicians